The 19th Grenadier Division  of the German Army in World War II was formed in October 1944 from the depleted 19. Luftwaffen-Sturm-Division ("19th Air Forces Assault Division"), which was transferred to the Heer ("Army") and renamed 19. Volksgrenadier-Division ("19th People's Grenadier Division") .

Commanders
 Oberst (later General-Major) Gerhard Bassenge : 1 October 1942 – 1 February 1943
Generalleutnant Otto Elfeldt (? Aug 1944 – ? Aug 1944)
Generalleutnant Walter Wißmath (? Aug 1944 – 9 Oct 1944)

Area of Operations
Denmark  	 (August 1944 – September 1944)
France  	 (September 1944 – October 1944)

Order of battle
Grenadier Regiment 59.
Grenadier Regiment 73.
Grenadier Regiment 74.
Artillery Regiment 719.
  1. Battalion
  2. Battalion
  3. Battalion
  4. Battalion
Panzerjäger Battalion 119.
Signals Battalion 119.
Engineer Battalion 119.
Supply troops

Notes

Sources
 Mitcham, Samuel W. Jr. German Order of Battle, Volume Two: 291st–999th Infantry Divisions, Named Divisions, and Special Divisions in WWII. Stackpole Books, 2007.
NARA T312R1319 (KTB of AOK 2)

German grenadier divisions
Military units and formations established in 1944
Military units and formations disestablished in 1944